Stephen Robert Pate (born May 26, 1961) is an American professional golfer who has played on both the PGA Tour, the Nationwide Tour and Champions Tour.

Career
Pate was born in Ventura, California. He attended UCLA and was a member of the golf team; one teammate was Corey Pavin, who joined Pate on the PGA Tour. Pate helped lead the team to the 1983 Pac-10 Championship, and earned All-American honors that year. He turned pro and joined the PGA Tour later that year.

Pate has won six PGA Tour events. His first victory was at the 1987 Southwest Golf Classic; and his most recent win was at the 1998 CVS Charity Classic. His best years in professional golf were 1988 when he won twice and finished 12th on the money list; and 1991, when he had five top-3 finishes including a win at the Honda Classic, earned $727,997 and finished 6th on the money list. His best finish in a major is a T-3 at both the 1988 U.S. Open and the 1991 Masters. Pate has had more than 70 top-10 finishes in PGA Tour events. He has featured in the top-50 of the Official World Golf Ranking.

Pate's golf career is riddled by injuries. At the height of his career, playing some of the best golf on the PGA Tour, he was in a three vehicle pile up at the 1991 Ryder Cup and mainly cheered his teammates on from the sidelines. In 1996, he was in a nearly fatal car accident, where he shattered his wrist. Pate was not sure he would ever compete again at the highest level. He did return to the PGA Tour and in 1999, he finished T-4 in the Masters, setting the record, which holds today, of seven consecutive birdies in his third round (later to be tied by Tiger Woods). Finishing 13th on the 1999 money list, Pate was named the PGA Tour's Comeback Player of the Year.

Pate was a member of two winning Ryder Cup teams, 1991 and 1999. As he entered his 40s, he began to split his playing time between the PGA Tour and the Nationwide Tour. He has one victory on the Nationwide Tour, the 2010 Pacific Rubiales Bogotá Open, which he won at age 48. It was his first professional win since 1998.

Pate made his Champions Tour debut on May 26, 2011, his 50th birthday, in the Senior PGA Championship.

Pate lives in Westlake Village, California. He acquired the nickname "Volcano" due to his eruptions on the golf course. In 2006, Pate teamed with Damian Pascuzzo completing numerous golf course design projects, including a recent remodel of La Costa.

Professional wins (8)

PGA Tour wins (6)

*Note: Tournament shortened to 54 holes due to rain.

PGA Tour playoff record (0–3)

Nationwide Tour wins (1)

Nationwide Tour playoff record (1–0)

Other wins (1)

Other playoff record (0–1)

Playoff record
Japan Golf Tour playoff record (0–1)

Results in major championships

CUT = missed the half-way cut
"T" = tied

Summary

Most consecutive cuts made – 13 (1988 PGA – 1992 Masters)
Longest streak of top-10s – 2 (1992 PGA – 1992 Masters)

Results in The Players Championship

CUT = missed the halfway cut
"T" indicates a tie for a place.

Results in World Golf Championships

1Cancelled due to 9/11

QF, R16, R32, R64 = Round in which player lost in match play
"T" = Tied
NT = No tournament

U.S. national team appearances
Kirin Cup: 1988 (winners)
Dunhill Cup: 1991
Ryder Cup: 1991, 1999

See also
1984 PGA Tour Qualifying School graduates
2003 PGA Tour Qualifying School graduates
List of golfers with most PGA Tour wins

References

External links

American male golfers
UCLA Bruins men's golfers
PGA Tour golfers
PGA Tour Champions golfers
Ryder Cup competitors for the United States
Golf course architects
Golfers from California
People from Ventura, California
People from Westlake Village, California
Sportspeople from Ventura County, California
1961 births
Living people